CCTV News  may refer to:
 CCTV News, the news department itself, of China Central Television
 CCTV-13 (formerly CCTV-新闻), a Chinese language news channel
 CGTN (TV channel), formerly CCTV-9 and CCTV-NEWS, an English language news channel